Itaguazurenda Airport,  is an airport serving the agricultural area  east of Charagua in the Santa Cruz Department of Bolivia.

See also

Transport in Bolivia
List of airports in Bolivia

References

External links 
OpenStreetMap - Itaguazurenda
OurAirports - Itaguazurenda
Fallingrain - Itaguazurenda Airport

Airports in Santa Cruz Department (Bolivia)